Brochiloricaria is a small genus of armored catfishes native to South America.

Species 
There are currently two recognized species in this genus:
 Brochiloricaria chauliodon Isbrücker, 1979
 Brochiloricaria macrodon (Kner, 1853)

Appearance and anatomy
Brochiloricaria is morphologically very similar to Loricaria and can be distinguished from the latter only by its teeth characteristics; in Brochiloricaria, the teeth are very long and of equal size on both jaws, while in Loricaria the premaxillary teeth are almost two times longer than dentary teeth. However, dentition may not be a reliable characteristic to differentiate to genera, so Brochiloricaria may actually be a synonym of Loricaria.

Both species of Brochiloricaria reach almost 30 centimetres (12 in) in length.

Ecology
Brochiloricaria is an abdomino-lip brooder.

References

Loricariini
Fish of South America
Fish of Argentina
Fauna of Brazil
Catfish genera
Taxa named by Isaäc J. H. Isbrücker
Taxa named by Han Nijssen
Freshwater fish genera